Cameron Duncan (4 August 1965 – 2 May 2017) was a Scottish footballer, who played as a goalkeeper.

Duncan started his career with Sunderland, where he only made a single Football League appearance. He then returned to Scotland with Motherwell and later played for Partick Thistle, Ayr United, and Albion Rovers.

Duncan died on 2 May 2017 from cancer.

References

1965 births
2017 deaths
Motherwell F.C. players
Partick Thistle F.C. players
Ayr United F.C. players
Sunderland A.F.C. players
Albion Rovers F.C. players
Scottish footballers
Association football goalkeepers
English Football League players
Scottish Football League players
Sportspeople from Shotts
Scotland youth international footballers
Deaths from cancer in Scotland
Footballers from North Lanarkshire